Thomas Jefferson Withers (1804 – November 7, 1865) was an American politician from South Carolina who served in the Confederate States Congress during the American Civil War.

Biography 
Withers was born in York County, South Carolina, and was elected as a state court judge in 1846, to fill the vacancy left by the election of Andrew Butler to the US Senate. He represented the state in the Provisional Confederate Congress in 1861 and signed the Confederate States Constitution although it was reported that when taking the oath to the new constitution, he refused to kiss the Bible.

Withers is also notable for the sexually explicit letters he wrote in 1826 to a college friend, future governor James Henry Hammond, with whom Withers had a homosexual relationship. The letters, which are housed among the Hammond Papers at the South Caroliniana Library, were first published by researcher Martin Duberman in 1981, and are remarkable for being rare documentary evidence of same-sex relationships in the antebellum United States.

Withers married a Miss Boykin (sister-in-law of Stephen Decatur Miller, governor of South Carolina), with whom he had several children. Withers died at Camden in Kershaw County, South Carolina, and was interred at the Quaker Cemetery in the same city.

References

External links
Political Graveyard

1804 births
1865 deaths
19th-century American politicians
LGBT people from South Carolina
Bisexual politicians
Burials in South Carolina
Deputies and delegates to the Provisional Congress of the Confederate States
People from York County, South Carolina
People of South Carolina in the American Civil War
Signers of the Confederate States Constitution
Signers of the Provisional Constitution of the Confederate States
South Carolina Democrats
South Carolina lawyers
Bisexual men
19th-century American lawyers